The CCTV Headquarters serves as the headquarters for China Central Television (CCTV) formerly located at the old China Central Television Building some  to the west. Feted by architecture critics as perhaps "the greatest work of architecture built in this century"  and awarded the 2013 Best Tall Building Worldwide from the Council on Tall Buildings and Urban Habitat, the 51-floor skyscraper on East Third Ring Road, Guanghua Road in the Beijing Central Business District (CBD). Groundbreaking took place on 1 June 2004 and the building's façade was completed in January 2008. After the construction was delayed by a fire that engulfed the adjacent Television Cultural Center in February 2009, the headquarters was completed in May 2012 and was officially inaugurated in June 2013.

Rem Koolhaas and Ole Scheeren of OMA were the architects in charge for the building, while Cecil Balmond at Arup provided the complex engineering design.

Background and Critical Reception
Architecture critics claim that "Mr. Koolhaas, of the Office for Metropolitan Architecture, has always been interested in making buildings that expose the conflicting energies at work in society, and the CCTV building is the ultimate expression of that aim," thus giving rise to "the slippery symbolism of its exterior."
The main building is not a traditional tower, but a loop of six horizontal and vertical sections covering  of floor space, creating an irregular grid on the building's façade with an open center. The construction of the building is considered to be a structural challenge, especially because it is in a seismic zone. Rem Koolhaas has said the building "could never have been conceived by the Chinese and could never have been built by Europeans. It is a hybrid by definition". Because of its radical shape, it is said that a taxi driver first came up with its nickname dà kùchǎ, roughly translated as "big boxer shorts". Locals often refer to it as "big pants".

The building was built in three buildings that were joined to become one and a half buildings on 30 May 2007. In order not to lock in structural differentials, this connection was scheduled in the early morning when the steel in the two towers cooled to the same temperature. The CCTV building was part of a media park intended to form a landscape of public entertainment, outdoor filming areas, and production studios as an extension of the central green axis of the CBD.

The Office for Metropolitan Architecture won the contract from the Beijing International Tendering Co. to construct the CCTV Headquarters and the Television Cultural Center by its side on 1 January 2002, after winning an international design competition. The jury included architect Arata Isozaki and critic Charles Jencks. It is among the first of 300 new towers in the new Beijing CBD. Administration, news, broadcasting, and program production offices and studios are all contained inside.

CCTV Headquarters was officially opened by the Chairman on 1 January 2008. Among the distinguished guests at the opening were Hu Jintao, Jiang Zemin, Wen Jiabao and Guo Jinlong.

CCTV Headquarters went on to be feted by architecture critics as perhaps "the greatest work of architecture built in this century,", and was awarded the 2013 Best Tall Building Worldwide from the Council on Tall Buildings and Urban Habitat.

2009 fire
An adjacent building in the complex, the Television Cultural Center, caught on fire, ignited by fireworks on Lantern Festival day, 9 February 2009, before the building's scheduled completion in May 2009. It was to have the Beijing Mandarin Oriental Hotel, a visitor's center, a large public theater, two recording studios with three audio control rooms, a digital cinema and two screening rooms. The  Mandarin Oriental Hotel was badly damaged and one fire fighter was killed. The director of the project and 19 others were imprisoned. On 25 October 2009, scaffolds were set up in the front gate of CCTV which indicated the renovation of the building had begun. As of 9 February 2010, the main CCTV tower was still unoccupied.

See also

 Diagrid
 List of tallest buildings in Beijing
Media buildings in Beijing
 China Media Group Headquarters (former CCTV headquarters)
 Central Radio & TV Tower
 Beijing Television Cultural Center
 Beijing TV Centre
 Phoenix Center

References

External links

CCTV Project Site
Office for Metropolitan Architecture (OMA) Project Site
China Central Television (CCTV) Headquarters Building & Cultural Centre, Beijing page for the engineering firm ARUP
Consulting services performed by RWDI
 CCTV Headquarters selected images 

China Central Television
Buildings and structures in Chaoyang District, Beijing
Commercial buildings completed in 2012
2012 establishments in China
Skyscraper office buildings in Beijing
Twin towers
Twisted buildings and structures
Deconstructivism
Postmodern architecture in China
Rem Koolhaas buildings
Ole Scheeren buildings
Ove Arup buildings and structures